Firstborn is a fantasy novel by Paul B. Thompson and Tonya R. Carter which is set in the world of the Dragonlance campaign setting and is the first volume in the Elven Nations series.

Synopsis
This novel takes place in the ancient elven city of Silvanost, where twin sons are born to Sithel, Speaker of the Stars and ruler of all the elves. On that same night, a prophecy is made that "They both shall wear crowns" even though there can only be one ruler of the Silvanesti. Sithas, the elder, is raised as heir to the throne, and the younger Kith-Kanan is allowed the freedom typically afforded a second son. Sithas believes in the purity of the elven people and aligns himself with the aristocrats of the court in Silvanost, while Kith-Kanan believes the future of Silvanesti will be enhanced by trade with outsiders, including the humans of Ergoth. When their father dies in a hunting accident, Sithas becomes Speaker of the Stars, and Kith-Kanan must swear fealty to his brother, although he questions the stand Sithas has taken against the humans.

Plot summary 
The leadership of the elves passes to Sithel, the son of the great and wise Silvanos, after the death of Silvanos. Sithel is a wise ruler, but his sons follow different paths; the elder twin, Sithas, follows the elven court while Kith-Kanan allies himself more with his Wildrunners and the humans of Ergoth.

Reception

References

1991 American novels
American fantasy novels
Dragonlance novels